Bill McKenzie was a New Zealand rugby league footballer who represented New Zealand.

Playing career
McKenzie played in the Canterbury Rugby League competition and represented Canterbury.

In 1947 he was first selected for the New Zealand national rugby league team, however he did not make his test debut until 1949 against Australia. He had earlier in the tour played against Australia for the South Island.

In 1950 he moved north and represented both Auckland and the North Island. He also played for the Ngaruawahia club in the Waikato Rugby League competition.

In 1952 he returned home, joining the newly formed Marist club in the Canterbury Rugby League competition. This helped relaunch his career and he was again selected for New Zealand, after a three-year absence.

References

Living people
New Zealand rugby league players
New Zealand national rugby league team players
Canterbury rugby league team players
South Island rugby league team players
Marist-Western Suburbs players
Rugby league wingers
Year of birth missing (living people)
Place of birth missing (living people)
Auckland rugby league team players
North Island rugby league team players
Ngaruawahia Panthers players